Tanja Mayer (born 2 July 1993) is a Swiss athlete and bobsledder. She competed in heptathlon at the junior level and started competing in bobsleigh in 2013.

Bobsleigh
On 26 January 2014, Tanja Mayer, along with Swiss pilot Fabienne Meyer, won the two-women World Cup race in Königsee, Germany. The race also doubled as the European Championship, earning them a gold medal.

She is competing as a brakewoman at the 2014 Winter Olympics.

European Championships
2014 European Championships –  Königssee,  with Fabienne Meyer

Athletics
Tanja competed in heptathlon at the junior level. In 2009, she took part in the World Youth Championships where she finished in 7th place. In 2011, she finished in 9th place at the European Junior Championships. She also competed at the 2012 World Junior Championships in Barcelona where she finished in 16th place.

References

1993 births
Living people
Swiss female bobsledders
Bobsledders at the 2014 Winter Olympics
Olympic bobsledders of Switzerland
Swiss heptathletes
Sportspeople from Thurgau